The Afzal Gunj Masjid, also known as AfzalGunj Masjid or Afzalgunj Mosque, is a mosque located in the Afzalgunj, Hyderabad, India. The mosque was constructed in 1866 by Afzal-ud-Daulah, the fifth Nizam of Hyderabad, after the construction of Nayapul which connects the city with its new establishment. The mosque is constructed in a style of three arched facade and the two minarets in the front corner of rectangular hall.

See also
 Heritage Structures of Hyderabad

References

Mosques in Hyderabad, India